Pikajuna is a powered roller coaster located at Linnanmäki in Helsinki, Finland. It was known as City Express during 1990–2003 seasons, but when Linnanmäki started a new naming policy in 2004, using only Finnish names for its rides, the ride was renamed Pikajuna. Pikajuna means "Express Train" in Finnish.

References 

Roller coasters in Finland
Linnanmäki
Roller coasters introduced in 1990